Abdullah Salim Al-Barwani (born 1965) is an Omani boxer. He competed in the men's welterweight event at the 1988 Summer Olympics.

References

External links
 

1965 births
Living people
Omani male boxers
Olympic boxers of Oman
Boxers at the 1988 Summer Olympics
Place of birth missing (living people)
Welterweight boxers